Georgina Herrera (born 23 April 1936 – 13 December 2021) was a Cuban writer of poetry, novels and short stories. She also wrote drama and scripts for radio and television series, as well as for film.

Biography
Georgina Herrera was born in Jovellanos, the capital of Matanzas Province, Cuba. She began writing when she was nine years old, and when she was 16 her first poems were published, in such Havana periodicals as El País and Diario de la Tarde. As Miriam DeCosta-Willis has noted of Herrera's work, "Many of her later poems capture the pain and loneliness of her growing-up years", during which she endured poverty, an absent father and the death of her mother when she was 14.

Aged 20, Herrera moved to Havana in 1956, and worked as a domestic; it was in the homes of her wealthy employers that she met writers, who encouraged her to publish. Early in the Cuban Revolution she became involved with the "Novación Literaria" movement, and began working as a scriptwriter at the Cuban Institute for Radio and Television.

She married the novelist Manolo Granados, and they had two children, though later divorced. According to multiple sources, she died on 13 December 2021 in Havana.

Writing
Her first poetry collection, G.H. appeared in 1962, after which she published several other books, characteristically using themes that centre on gender, Afro-Cuban history, and the African legacy: Gentes y cosas (1974), Granos de sol y luna (1974), Grande es el tiempo (1989), Gustadas sensaciones (1996), Gritos (2004), África (2006), and Gatos y liebres or Libro de las conciliaciones (2010). Although best known as a poet, Herrera has also worked as a scriptwriter for radio, television and film. With Daisy Rubiera she co-authored a memoir entitled Golpeando la memoria: Testimonio de una poeta cubana afrodescendiente (Ediciones Unión, 2005).

According to dissident journalist Jorge Olivera Castillo: "A recurring theme in her work reveals a commitment to her race regarding the avatars of their current existence and a past that is also filled with stigmas.... It is also important to point out that she was part of the repressed Grupo El Puente literary and publishing group, which in the 1960s attempted to create a space for art and literature beyond the confines of officialdom. This caused her to be marginalized, as happened with almost all of the group’s members. Yet, despite the obstacles...Georgina Herrera did not opt for exile or silencing her woes. She persevered in her desire to defend her principled position—and she won."

Herrera won much recognition both in Cuba and abroad. Her work has been translated into various languages and is included in the anthologies Breaking the Silences: 20th Century Poetry by Cuban Women (ed. Margaret Randall)
and Daughters of Africa (ed. Margaret Busby). She was also a contributor to Afro-Cuban Voices: On Race and Identity in Contemporary Cuba, edited by Pedro Pérez Sarduy and Jean Stubbs.

A bi-lingual Spanish/English collection of Herrera's work, entitled Always Rebellious/Cimarroneando: Selected Poems (published by Cubanabooks, a US-based non-profit company specialising in Cuban women's literature), won the 2016 International Latino Book Award for Best Bilingual Poetry Book. Herrera said of the collection, whose title references maroons, Africans who escaped from enslavement in the Americas: "The inspiration for the book was my life experiences, it is a definition of me."

Selected bibliography
 G.H. (Ediciones El Puente, 1962)
 Gentes y cosas (Ediciones Unión, 1974
 Granos de sol y luna (Ediciones Unión, 1974)
 Grande es el tiempo (Ediciones Unión, 1989)
 Gustadas sensaciones (Ediciones Unión, 1996)
 Gritos (Torre de Papel, 2004)
 África (Ediciones Manglar y Uvero, 2006)
 Gatos y liebres or Libro de las conciliaciones (Ediciones Unión, 2010)

Memoir
 with Daisy Rubiera, Golpeando la memoria: Testimonio de una poeta cubana afrodescendiente (Ediciones Unión, 2005)

Bi-lingual collection
 Always Rebellious/Cimarroneando: Selected Poems (Cubanabooks, 2014). Translated from the Spanish by María Rodríguez-Alcalá, Juanamaría Cordones-Cook, and Alexander Cordones Cook.

References

External links
 "Georgina Herrera Cardenas" at AfroCubaWeb
 "Georgina Herrera Reads Her Poetry --filmed and directed by Juanamaría Cordones Cook". YouTube video.
 "Interview with Cuban Poet Georgina Herrera" (video), Cubanabooks Press, 24 September 2014.
 "Georgina Herrera Cardenas" at AfroCubaWeb.

1936 births
2021 deaths
20th-century Cuban poets
20th-century Cuban women writers
21st-century Cuban poets
21st-century Cuban women writers
Cuban women poets
People from Matanzas Province